Antonio Rubio Pérez (Soriano, 1882 – 28 November 1953) was a Uruguayan journalist and politician.

He briefly served as President of the National Council of Administration in 1933. He served as the President of the Chamber of Deputies of Uruguay in 1947.

References

1882 births
1953 deaths
People from Soriano Department
Presidents of the Chamber of Representatives of Uruguay
National Council of Government (Uruguay)
Colorado Party (Uruguay) politicians
Uruguayan journalists
20th-century journalists